Los Perales Airport  is an airport serving the city of Bahía de Caráquez in Manabí Province, Ecuador. The airport is across the Chone River from the city and is reached via a  causeway.

The Bahia de Caraquez non-directional beacon (ident: BCN) is located on the field.

See also

 List of airports in Ecuador
 Transport in Ecuador

References

External links
 HERE Maps - Los Perales
 OpenStreetMap - Los Perales
 OurAirports - Los Perales
 Skyvector Aeronautical Charts - Los Perales

Airports in Ecuador